Shiva Kumar may refer to:

 Shiva Kumar (general) (born 1948), Indian general
 Shiva Kumar Mandal, Nepalese politician
 Shiva Kumar Rai (1919-1995), Indian writer and politician